Thanasis Oikonomou (born 2 April 1978) is a Greek swimmer who competed in the 2000 Summer Olympics.

References

https://www.sports-reference.com/olympics/athletes/oi/thanasis-oikonomou-1.html

1978 births
Living people
Greek male swimmers
Greek male freestyle swimmers
Olympic swimmers of Greece
Swimmers at the 2000 Summer Olympics
European Aquatics Championships medalists in swimming
Mediterranean Games gold medalists for Greece
Mediterranean Games medalists in swimming
Swimmers at the 2001 Mediterranean Games